The 1948–49 Divizia B was the 10th season of the second tier of the Romanian football league system.

The format was changed from four series of 16 teams to two series, each one of them having 14 teams. At the end of the season the winners of the series has been promoted in the Divizia A and the last five teams from the each series relegated to Divizia C.

Team changes

To Divizia B
Promoted from Divizia C
 —

Relegated from Divizia A
 Dermata Cluj
 Ploiești
 Dinamo B București
 UD Reșița

From Divizia B
Relegated to Divizia C
 Stăruința Satu Mare 
 Electrica Timișoara
 BNR București
 CFR Târgoviște
 Ripensia Timișoara
 Sticla Târnăveni
 CFR Caracal
 Textila Buhuși
 CFR Arad
 CFR Simeria
 CFR BuzăuCFR Iași
 UF Hunedoara
 Minaur Baia Mare
 Craiova
 Danubiana Roman
 Indagrara Arad
 CFR Turda
 CFR Brașov
 Tractorul Brașov
 Locomotiva Reșița
 Explosivii Făgăraș
 CFR Craiova
 Astra Română Poiana
 Metalosport Ferdinand
 Tisa Sighet
 PCA Constanța
 Franco-Româna Brăila
 Lugoj
 CFR Târgu Mureș
 Venus București
 ST București
 Gloria Arad
 Doljul Craiova
 Dinamo Suceava

Promoted to Divizia A
 Metalochimic București
 Politehnica Timișoara

Excluded teams 
Sparta Arad and CS Aninoasa were excluded from Divizia B.

Renamed teams 
Crișana Oradea was renamed as CFR Oradea.

FC Ploiești was renamed as CFR Ploiești.

Gloria CFR Galați was renamed as CFR Galați.

Socec Lafayette București was renamed as Socec București.

Sporting Pitești was renamed as Țesătatoria Română Pitești.

Șoimii CFR Sibiu was renamed as CFR Sibiu.

UD Reșița was renamed as Metalochimic Reșița.

Other teams 
Phoenix Baia Mare and Minaur Baia Mare merged, the new formed team was named as CSM Baia Mare.

Ferar Cluj and CFR Cluj merged, Ferar being absorbed by CFR, also CFR Cluj was promoted to Divizia A in the place of Ferar.

League tables

Serie I

Serie II

See also 

 1948–49 Divizia A

References

Liga II seasons
Romania
2